The Battle of Ecbatana was fought in 129 BC between the Seleucids led by Antiochus VII Sidetes and the Parthians led by Phraates II, and marked the final attempt on the part of the Seleucids to regain their power in the east against the Parthians. After their defeat, the territory of the Seleucids was limited to the area of Syria.

Battle
Phraates II (ca. 139/138 BC – ca. 128 BC) faced the final attempt on the part of the Seleucids to regain their power in the east. The Seleucids amassed a large force of Greek mercenaries and led the army, totaling 80,000 soldiers, to confront the Parthians, initiating a campaign in 130 BC to retake Mesopotamia. The Parthian general Indates was defeated along the Great Zab, followed by a local uprising where the Parthian governor of Babylonia was killed. Antiochus conquered Babylonia and occupied Susa, where he minted coins, and advanced his army into Media. 

After these initial successes, defeating the Parthians in three battles, Phraates sent a delegation to negotiate a peace agreement. Antiochus refused to accept unless the Arsacids relinquished all lands to him except Parthia proper, paid heavy tribute, and released Antiochus' brother Demetrius II from captivity. Arsaces released Demetrius and sent him to Syria, but refused the other demands. 

Antiochus then dispersed his army into their winter quarters. By spring 129 BC, the Medes were in open revolt against Antiochus, whose army had exhausted the resources of the countryside during winter.  The cities revolted against their presence so Antiochus marched to support one such isolated garrison with only a small force (probably only his Royal Guards). Phraates exploited the situation and ambushed him, inflicting a crushing defeat upon Seleucid forces at the Battle of Ecbatana (modern Hamadan). During the battle, Antiochus VII was killed and his royal guard was annihilated. His body was sent back to Syria in a silver coffin; his son Seleucus was made a Parthian hostage and a daughter joined Phraates' harem.

After the Battle of Ecbatana, the rest of Selecuid army which was based in Media was largely destroyed, and the remainder was captured and folded into Parthian ranks. This battle marked the decisive and final defeat for the Seleucid Empire by the Parthians and ended the Hellenistic period in Iran.

Protagonists
The Battle of Ecbatana was fought between the Seleucids led by Antiochus VII Sidetes and the Parthians led by Phraates II.

References

Sources

 .
 .
 .
 .
 .
 .
 .

129 BC
Ecbatana 129 BC
Ecbatana
History of Hamadan Province
Ecbatana
2nd century BC in Iran